Andrei Chistyakov (Андрей Чистяков, born March 14, 1962) is a retired professional ice hockey player who played in the Soviet Hockey League for Salavat Yulaev Ufa and HC Spartak Moscow.

Career statistics

References 

1962 births
Furuset Ishockey players
HC Spartak Moscow players
Living people
Russian ice hockey defencemen
Salavat Yulaev Ufa players
Soviet ice hockey defencemen
Sportspeople from Ufa
Timrå IK players
Russian expatriates in Norway